Sergei Aleksandrovich Shulgin (born 22 February 1963) is a former Russian professional footballer.

Club career
He made his professional debut in the Soviet Top League in 1983 for FC Spartak Moscow. He played 1 game for FC Lokomotiv Moscow main squad in the Soviet Cup.

Honours
 Soviet Top League runner-up: 1983, 1984.
 Russian Premier League runner-up: 1994.
 Russian Cup winner: 1995 (scored the winning penalty kick in the shootout in the final game).

European club competitions
With FC Dynamo Moscow.

 UEFA Cup 1994–95: 2 games.
 UEFA Cup Winners' Cup 1995–96: 5 games.

References

1963 births
Living people
Footballers from Moscow

Soviet footballers
Russian footballers
Association football midfielders
Association football defenders
Soviet Top League players
FC Spartak Moscow players
FC Asmaral Moscow players
Russian Premier League players
PFC CSKA Moscow players
FC Lokomotiv Moscow players
FC Tyumen players
FC Dynamo Moscow players